The men's marathon at the 2012 Olympic Games in London took place on the Olympic marathon street course on 12 August, the final day of the Games. One hundred and five athletes from 67 nations competed. The event was won by Stephen Kiprotich of Uganda, the nation's first Olympic men's marathon victory and the nation's only medal in 2012. Kenya earned its fourth and fifth medals in five Games, with Abel Kirui's silver and Wilson Kipsang's bronze.
 
As is customary, the men's marathon medals were presented as part of the Closing Ceremony, which took place later that day, in the Olympic Stadium – the last medal presentation of the Games.

Summary

Stephen Kiprotich from Uganda won the gold medal — the country's only medal at the 2012 Games. Abel Kirui and Wilson Kipsang, both from Kenya, took silver and bronze respectively. Twenty athletes did not finish the race, which took place on a warm and sunny day.

The race started off slowly. In the first , Brazilian runner Franck Caldeira broke away on two occasions, only to get swallowed up by the pack. Between 10K and 12K, Wilson Kipsang Kiprotich moved to the front in a more serious breakaway. The large pack broke up into a small chase pack of eight runners, primarily East African. With a fast , Kipsang Kiprotich opened up a gap of about 15 seconds, which lasted for the next 10 miles but never increased significantly.
The chase group shrunk to Abel Kirui and Stephen Kiprotich, with Ayele Abshero just behind. While Abshero did not gain contact, the other three formed a lead pack. The two Kenyan teammates ran together, with the Ugandan trailing slightly. By 35K, the group of three had over a minute gap on the next competitor, Marilson dos Santos. At the  marker, Kiprotich touched his leg as if he were struggling and he fell back a few seconds. At the  marker, Kiprotich moved past the two Kenyans. His next mile was 4:42, opening up a 17-second gap on Kirui, with Kipsang falling back. Kiprotich extended his lead by 9 seconds and picked up a Ugandan flag before crossing the finish line.

Background

This was the 27th appearance of the event, which is one of 12 athletics events to have been held at every Summer Olympics. Returning runners from the 2008 marathon included sixth-place finisher Viktor Röthlin of Switzerland, eighth-place finisher Yared Asmerom of Eritrea, and tenth-place finisher Ryan Hall of the United States. The 2004 silver medalist Meb Keflezighi of the United States, who had not competed in Beijing, also returned. Abel Kirui of Kenya had won the past two world championships in 2009 and 2011. His countryman Patrick Makau Musyoki had set the world record in 2011, but could not finish the 2012 London Marathon due to injury and was not selected for the Kenyan team. Wilson Kipsang and Emmanuel Mutai joined Kirui on the Kenyan team instead; Kipsang was the favorite in the hundred-plus runner field.

Iceland made its first appearance in Olympic men's marathons. South Sudan had one runner appear as an Independent Olympic Athlete. The United States made its 26th appearance, most of any nation, having missed only the boycotted 1980 Games.

Competition format and course

As all Olympic marathons, the competition was a single race. The marathon distance of 26 miles, 385 yards was run over a course that started and finished on The Mall in central London. Runners completed one short circuit of  around part of the City of Westminster and then three longer circuits of  around Westminster, the Victoria Embankment and the City of London. The course was designed to pass many of London's best-known landmarks, including Buckingham Palace, Trafalgar Square, St Paul's Cathedral, the Bank of England, Leadenhall Market, the Monument, the Tower of London and the Houses of Parliament.

Records

, the existing world and Olympic records stood as follows.

No new world or Olympic records were set during the competition.

Schedule

All times are British Summer Time (UTC+1)

Results

References

External links
Full Results at Official Site

Athletics at the 2012 Summer Olympics
2012 Olympic Marathon
Marathons at the Olympics
Summer Olympics
Men's marathons
Men's events at the 2012 Summer Olympics